Christopher Michael Bostick (born March 24, 1993) is an American former professional baseball outfielder and second baseman. He played in Major League Baseball (MLB) for the Pittsburgh Pirates and Miami Marlins.

Career
Bostick grew up in Gates, New York, and attended the Aquinas Institute in Rochester, New York. Playing for the school's baseball team, he had a .507 batting average as a junior and a .510 average as a senior. In his senior year, he was named the New York State Class B Player of the Year. He committed to attend St. John's University on a college baseball scholarship.

Oakland Athletics
The Oakland Athletics selected Bostick in the 44th round, with the 1,366th overall selection, of the 2011 MLB draft. He opted to sign with the Athletics rather than attend college, and received a $125,000 signing bonus.

Bostick made his professional debut with the Arizona Athletics of the Rookie-level Arizona League in 2011, and played for the Vermont Lake Monsters of the Class A-Short Season New York–Penn League in 2012. He appeared in the New York–Penn League All-Star Game. The Athletics assigned Bostick to the Beloit Snappers of the Class A Midwest League in 2013.

Texas Rangers
On December 3, 2013, the Athletics traded Bostick and Michael Choice to the Texas Rangers for outfielder Craig Gentry and pitcher Josh Lindblom. Playing for the Myrtle Beach Pelicans of the Class A-Advanced Carolina League, Bostick had a .251 batting average, a .322 on-base percentage, and a .412 slugging percentage.

Washington Nationals
After the 2014 season, the Rangers traded Bostick and Abel De Los Santos to the Washington Nationals for Ross Detwiler. Bostick began the 2015 season with the Potomac Nationals of the Carolina League, and was promoted to the Harrisburg Senators of the Class AA Eastern League in June, and then played for the Salt River Rafters in the Arizona Fall League following the 2015 season, where he had ten extra base hits in 71 at bats. The Nationals added him to their 40-man roster after the 2015 season. After beginning the 2016 season with Harrisburg, he received a promotion to the Syracuse Chiefs of the Class AAA International League in June.

Pittsburgh Pirates
The Nationals designated Bostick for assignment in September 2016. They traded him to the Pittsburgh Pirates for Taylor Gushue and cash considerations. He began the 2017 season with the Indianapolis Indians of the International League, and was promoted to the major leagues on May 8. He batted 8-for-27 (.296) for the Pirates in 2017.

Miami Marlins
The Pirates designated Bostick for assignment on August 7, 2018. The Miami Marlins acquired Bostick on August 12 for cash considerations. He elected to become a free agent after the 2018 season after clearing waivers.

Baltimore Orioles
On November 14, 2018, Bostick signed a minor league deal with the Baltimore Orioles and was assigned to the Norfolk Tides of the International League for the 2019 season. He became a free agent following the 2019 season.

References

External links

1993 births
Living people
Sportspeople from Rochester, New York
Baseball players from New York (state)
Major League Baseball outfielders
Pittsburgh Pirates players
Miami Marlins players
Arizona League Athletics players
Vermont Lake Monsters players
Beloit Snappers players
Myrtle Beach Pelicans players
Potomac Nationals players
Harrisburg Senators players
Syracuse Chiefs players
Indianapolis Indians players
Salt River Rafters players
Gulf Coast Pirates players
New Orleans Baby Cakes players
Norfolk Tides players